William Malone (born 1943) is an American horror filmmaker who directed several movies such as the 1999 remake House on Haunted Hill, Scared to Death, Creature, and FeardotCom.

After a brief career in makeup and costumes, he attended UCLA film school and moved on as a director thereafter.

History
Malone was born in 1947 in Lansing, Michigan where, during high school, he played in a Beatles-inspired garage band called The Plagues. The band released several 45 rpm singles on their own label Quarantined Records and on Fenton Records, an independent record label (affiliated with now defunct Great Lakes Studios, in Sparta, MI).

Malone moved to California at age 19 to pursue a career in music. However, after a friend's encouragement, Malone found himself getting involved in film and working a job at Don Post Studios, doing makeup and costume work.

After attending UCLA film school, Malone soon thereafter directed his first film, Scared to Death. After which he directed television (i.e. Tales from the Crypt) and various films.

Malone is also a well-known collector of Forbidden Planet memorabilia.

Selected filmography
 Scared to Death (1980)
 Creature (1985)
 Freddy's Nightmares – "Lucky Stiff" (1988)
 Tales From The Crypt – "Only Skin Deep" (1994)
 W.E.I.R.D. World (1995 TV film)
 House on Haunted Hill (1999)
 FeardotCom (2002)
 Masters of Horror – "Fair-Haired Child" (2006)
 Parasomnia (2008)

See also
Masters of Horror

References

External links

 William Malone's official website

American film directors
Horror film directors
American male screenwriters
1953 births
Living people
Artists from Lansing, Michigan
Screenwriters from Michigan